Astrological Straits is the debut full-length studio album by American recording artist Zach Hill. It was released on August 12, 2008 by Anticon and Ipecac Records.

Critical reception

Astrological Straits has received generally favorable reviews from music critics. On Metacritic, which assigns a weighted average score out of 100 to reviews and ratings from mainstream critics, the album received a metascore of 72, based on six reviews. Michael Patrick Brady of The Phoenix called the album an "unrestrained torrent of challenging yet tuneful rock" and pointed out that this album served as an outlet for Hill's "abstract ideas". Marc Masters of Pitchfork Media found that Hill's drumming dominated the album. He compared the sound to the work of Liars, Boredoms, Lightning Bolt and Frank Zappa while comparing his vocals on the track "Hindsight Is Nowhere" to those of Angus Andrew, vocalist of Liars. John Bohannon of PopMatters complimented the melodies on the album while he criticized the "bombardment of snare drum and obnoxious electronic tones" as well as the choice of including Les Claypool in the album. Nick Greer of Sputnikmusic called Hill's drumming "virtuostic, strange, and interesting" while describing his vocals as compressed and monotonous. He compared the guitar sounds on the album to those of Hella's Spencer Seim's work with added "strange slides and electronic, microtonal blurs". Greer appreciated the more pop-driven songs to more experimental ones and called parts of the album "nearly unlistenable".

Track listing

Personnel
Credits for Astrological Straits adapted from album liner notes.

Performance
Steve Borth – saxophone
Les Claypool – bass guitar
Josh Hill – guitar
Zach Hill – art direction, bass, cornet, electric piano, gong, guitar, drums, effects, keyboards, loops, mamola, melodica, piano, production, programming, synthesizer, trumpet, vocals
Jonathan Hischke – bass, synth bass
Dan Elkan – backup vocals, guitar
Carson McWhirter – bass, recording
Robby Moncrief – guitar

Chino Moreno – vocals
Zac Nelson – vocals
Tyler Pope – effects, programming
Randy Randall – guitar
Katelyn Reeves – cornet, flute, photography
Dean Spuntz – baritone guitar
RT Thomas – guitar sample
John Reed Thompson – bass, bugle, engineering, guitar, mixing, production, recording, trumpet
Marco Benevento – piano (Necromancer)

Technical
John Golden – mixing
Rich Good – design

Release history

References

External links

2008 debut albums
Zach Hill albums
Anticon albums
Ipecac Recordings albums